The City Hall building, located at Ninth and Skull Streets, Lebanon, Lebanon County, Pennsylvania was an Italianate style three-story brick and sandstone commercial building constructed in 1873 by the Church of the Brethren’s United Brethren Mutual Aid Society of Pennsylvania. The building served as the Lebanon City Hall building from 1898 until 1962. The centrally located cupola on the roof had a tall flagpole on its peak and was the building's most recognizable and distinctive feature. The building's water storage tank and a large bronze bell were housed within the cupola. In 1962, the City of Lebanon abandoned the building and moved all their offices into the newly constructed Lebanon County/City Municipal Building at 400 South 8th Street, Lebanon. The City Hall building was demolished the following year.

Original Uses
From 1873 to around 1890, the building was used by the Church of the Brethren's United Brethren Mutual Aid Society of Pennsylvania for their local operations. During the early 1890s, the building was repurposed into a shoe factory.

Purchased by the City of Lebanon
In 1897, the City of Lebanon purchased the building for $15,000. The building was then repurposed to house the city's offices. On September 9, 1898, the Lebanon City Council held its first meeting in the recently repurposed City Hall building. 
The City of Lebanon's police station, law enforcement offices and six single holding cells and one large cell for the confinement of prisoners were housed in the building's basement. The first floor housed the offices of the City Treasurer and Controller, the Mayor's office and Mayor's Court Room and a large wall vault. The second and third floors housed the Council Chambers, law department, city engineer, fire alarm superintendent and fire alarm apparatus, a small chemical laboratory, several committee rooms and several multi-purpose rooms separated by folding doors.

Abandonment
In 1962, after serving as the City of Lebanon's City Hall building for 65 years the city abandoned the structure as all of their offices were relocated to the new newly constructed Lebanon County/City Municipal Building at 400 South 8th Street, Lebanon. Attempts to sell the building failed.

Demolition
In March 1963, the City of Lebanon paid $2,960.50 to the Moody Salvage Company to demolish the structure. The 2,000-pound bronze bell that hung inside the cupola was the only artifact salvaged by the City of Lebanon.

Legacy
The City Hall building was one of Lebanon County's most interesting historic landmarks of the nineteenth and twentieth centuries. Its Italianate architectural style enabled it to stand out among almost every other building of its era in the City and County of Lebanon, Pennsylvania.

References

External links
 Italianate Architecture and History.
 Picturesque Italianate Architecture in the U.S.

Commercial buildings completed in 1873
Italianate architecture
Italianate architecture in Pennsylvania
Buildings and structures in Lebanon County, Pennsylvania
Lebanon County, Pennsylvania
Demolished buildings and structures in Pennsylvania
Buildings and structures demolished in 1963